Tisza Cipő (Hungarian for Tisza Shoe) is a brand of Hungarian sports shoes that existed in the Communist era, which has made a resurgence in recent years as a hip new fashion brand in that country. "Cipő" is Hungarian for "shoe," and Tisza is a river in Central Europe. The shoes in playful colors and designs are featured on the company's web site.

History 

In the 1930s, Thomas Bata came to Hungary to open a shoe factory somewhere in the country. During a journey he visited Martfű where the railway, public and water traffic meet, and he found it suitable for the Tisza Cipő factory. He bought the parcel in 1939, which was 593 cadastral hold, and he paid, 325000 pengő for it. The construction begun and the Cikta Rt., which was the former name of the shoe factory, started the production of loungers in 1942. During the Second World War many things changed in the factory, directors of the factory frequently alternated, however; the Shoe factory never shut down. After the war, the factory suffered many losses, for instance; wooden treaded shoes were manufactured instead of the rubber ones. In August 1949, The Cikta Rt. was renamed to Tisza Cipő Nemzeti Vállalat (Tisza Shoe National Corporation). During the 1950s and 1960s, the factory produced shoes for the inner market and exported only to socialist countries. At these times, they produced a large quantity of boots for the Ministry of Interior, the Ministry of Defense and the Civil Guard. In December 1970, The Tisza Shoe Factory wanted a new logo instead of their old one, and then they put in the application for the authorisation of their new logo, which they obtained in the first months of 1971. Finally, the Tisza company started to produce sport shoes, which very soon became one of the favourite shoes of the youth. Many facts show us that the production of sport shoes was a very good decision. For instance, from May 1971 the German Adidas manufactured its football shoes called La Paz in the Tisza factory. From the beginning of the 1970s many new models came to light, some of them were very similar to today's old school type of shoes. One of the first shoes, which the Tisza Factory produced, was a rubber sole - vulcanized - gym shoes which were manufactured in many colours. The variety of sport shoes is widened and besides the normal shoes long-legged style shoes were produced and also different shoes were produced leather and linen for different sport activities. At that time the Tisza factory was the biggest shoe factory in Hungary-where not only shoes were manufactured but other factories rubber soles. They produced 10,000,000 pairs of shoes annually and 3,000,000 of them were gym shoes. Besides the quantity, the factory took care of the quality. In July 1970, the gym shoes which sole were made of PVC won the excellent product prize. At the 1976 Budapest International Fair, the Tisza leisure shoe family won the Fair's prize. 1976 brought several international successes for the Tisza Cipő factory. For instance, the French ADIDAS signed a multi-year contract with them and the factory's production appeared on the English market. At the same year an agreement was made on the first American export were not only casual shoes were ordered but 50 thousands sport shoes. Tisza shoe company also produced 2 million pairs of shoes for the socialist market. In the 1970s, the Tisza shoe company's products reached the Kuwait's and Liberia's markets. 1976 brought further development. In the 1990s, the import increased and more and more brands could get into the domestic market. Until the middle of the 1990s, the Tisza Shoe factory made sport shoes and after that, it started manufacturing street shoes for women, men and children. From the summer of 2003 the Tisza company has again started to produce sport shoes. Besides the old models, they produce new ones.

Clash Kft

In 2003, The Clash Kft has bought the rights of the usage of the Tisza trademark. This means that clash company can use Tisza as a trademark and shoes can be produced anywhere, not just in the traditional Tisza Shoe Factory in Martfű. Nowadays, we have three places where Tisza shoes are produced and six shops where customers can buy them. The Clash company also wants to have Tisza trademark to remain pure Hungarian, therefore, the shoes are produced only in Hungary, although the cost of production is very expensive. The marketing aim of the Clash Kft. is a long-live company, in order to achieve this they have worked out a special marketing plan; the expansion of the company is very slow and the profit of which the company gathers a year is given back to its origin, to develop the company. The Clash Kft also makes clothes and accessories. The idea of the whole business came from a young, talented, Hungarian man, László Vidák, who was also an importer of a very popular shoe in Hungary a couple of years ago.

Clash Kft and The Tisza Shoe

In May 2009 the original Tisza Company in Martfű went bankrupt; from the 102 employees 85 quit. But the Clash Kft continues to make the Tisza Shoe.

References

Links 
 Tisza Cipő official website 
 Minden időben, Tisza cipőben! 

Manufacturing companies of Hungary
Sport in Hungary
Sporting goods manufacturers
Athletic shoe brands
Hungarian brands
Clothing companies established in 1942
Shoe companies
2000s fashion
2010s fashion
1942 establishments in Hungary